The Olimpik Baku 2006–07 season was Olimpik Baku's second Azerbaijan Premier League season and their first season with Asgar Abdullayev as manager. They participated in the 2006–07 Azerbaijan Top League as well as the 2006–07 Azerbaijan Cup, finishing the league in 6th and reaching the Last 16 stage of the cup where they were eliminated by Turan Tovuz.

Squad

Transfers

Summer

In:

Out:

Winter

In:

Out:

Competitions

Azerbaijan Premier League

Results

Table

Azerbaijan Cup

Squad statistics

Appearances and goals

|-
|colspan="14"|Players who appeared for Olimpik Baku and left during the season:

|}

Goal scorers

Notes
Qarabağ have played their home games at the Tofiq Bahramov Stadium since 1993 due to the ongoing situation in Quzanlı.

References

External links 
 AZAL PFC Official Web Site
 AZAL PFC  at PFL.AZ
 AZAL PFC Official Facebook Page

AZAL PFC seasons
AZAL